Otter Pops are a brand of freeze pops sold in the United States. The product consists of a clear plastic tube filled with a fruit-flavored liquid and is one of the earliest brands of this dessert.

Some varieties claim to contain 100% fruit juice, mostly apple juice. This variety was white, as it also removed any artificial colors. Otter Pops are a frozen treat, but stores generally sell them at room temperature for the consumer to later freeze at home.

Background
National Pax introduced Otter Pops in 1970, in competition with Jel Sert's similar product, Fla-Vor-Ice. In 1996, Jel Sert acquired the rights to Otter Pops as well. During the 2000s, Jel Sert modified the Otter Pops recipe to add more fruit juice.
The company's manufacturing facilities are in West Chicago, Illinois. Otter Pops come in 1-, 1.5-, 2- and 5.5-ounce serving sizes. They also come in 6 flavors, each named after a different character:

 Blue (blue raspberry): Louie-Bloo Raspberry
 Red (strawberry):  Strawberry Short Kook
 Pink (fruit punch):  Poncho Punch
 Yellow (lemon): Rip Van Lemon (discontinued in the late 1970s)
 Green (lime): Sir Isaac Lime
 Purple (grape): Alexander the Grape
 Orange ( orange (fruit)): Little Orphan Orange
 Gold (mango): Major Mango
 Yellow (pineapple) DJ Tropicool
 White (coconut) Cosmic Coconut
 Cyan (tropical punch) Anita Fruit Punch
 Red (cherry) Scarlet 'O Cherry (discontinued in the mid 1990s)

Sir Isaac Lime protest
In 1995, National Pax had planned to replace the "Sir Isaac Lime" flavor with "Scarlett O'Cherry", and to remove it permanently until a group of Orange County, California fourth-graders created a petition in opposition and picketed the company's headquarters in early 1996. The crusade also included an e-mail campaign, in which a Stanford University professor reportedly accused the company of "Otter-cide". After meeting with the children, company executives relented and retained the Sir Isaac Lime flavor with "Scarlet O'Cherry" once  during 1983 to 1995 but then being forever put on hold.

Other uses
Over the generations, other uses of Otter Pops have been devised and shared in the US. They can be used as a colorful substitute for ice in a punch bowl or to flavor mixed drinks.

See also
 Pop (frozen snack)
 Fla-Vor-Ice
 List of frozen dessert brands

References

External links
Official Otter Pops website

Brand name frozen desserts
Brand name snack foods
Jel Sert brands
Products introduced in 1970
Fictional otters

de:Wassereis (Lebensmittel)